Han Park is a professor at the University of Georgia in the United States.

He has acted as an unofficial negotiator between the United States and North Korea.

He was born in the Republic of China in an area now controlled by the People's Republic of China.  His parents were Korean.  He has a Seoul National University B.A., an American University M.A., a University of Minnesota Ph.D.

He is Director of the Center for the Study of Global Issues (GLOBIS) at the University of Georgia.

He negotiated for the release of Laura Ling and Euna Lee, two American citizens who crossed the border (according to their confession) to do a news story about North Korea.  They were accompanied by a camera man and Korean guide but both men were able to run away faster when the North Koreans tried to arrest the four.

Hillary Clinton refused to say whether she sent Park to negotiate on behalf of the U.S. government.

References
https://web.archive.org/web/20090412203449/http://spia.uga.edu/news/releases/han_park_speaks_to_cnn_on_recent_events_in_north_korea/

https://web.archive.org/web/20091208091639/http://hanpark.myweb.uga.edu/biosketch.html

https://www.pbs.org/newshour/bb/asia/july-dec97/skorea_12-19.html

http://news.bbc.co.uk/2/hi/asia-pacific/8145440.stm

Living people
University of Minnesota alumni
Year of birth missing (living people)
North Korea–United States relations